Lubiao Subdistrict formerly a town situated in western Anning City, Yunnan province, southwestern China. Its status changed to a subdistrict of Anning in 2011. The name Lubiao means "a place with many white stones" in Yi language.

References

Anning, Yunnan
Township-level divisions of Kunming